David M. Watson is an Australian ornithologist and ecologist who is also a scientific specialist on mistletoes. He served on the New South Wales Threatened Species Scientific Committee from 2015 until publicly resigning in June 2017 in protest after the NSW Berejiklian government passed a bill granting heritage status to feral horses in the Kosciuszko National Park.

Education 
Watson completed a BSc (Honours) in biology from Monash University in 1994 with a thesis titled "The dynamics of bird communities in remnant buloke (Allocasuarina luehmanni) woodlands". Watson completed a PhD in 1999 at the University of Kansas, with a thesis "Temporal scale and the consequences of habitat fragmentation: Case studies on Mesoamerican highland birds" based on fieldwork centered in Oaxaca, Mexico.

Career 
Watson is an ecologist with a research focus on habitat fragmentation and the ecological interactions between plants and birds. He has an interest in the tools of ecological monitoring such as survey methods and acoustic monitoring. He became fascinated with mistletoe during his Honours degree and subsequently wrote a global review of mistletoes as a keystone resource in forests and woodlands worldwide. After this publication, he conducted a large removal experiment of mistletoes from woodlands in Australia and showed that mistletoes acted as drivers of bird diversity, especially insectivores. He wrote  Mistletoes of Southern Australia in 2011 (2nd ed., 2019)/. Currently, his research focus is on the effects of mistletoe on tree health and soils, mostly in farming and production landscapes, including macadamia crops in Queensland, the introduction of mistletoe in urban trees to increase biodiversity within the urban landscape, and conservation of sandalwood in Western Australia. Watson developed the 'standardized search' using the Chao estimator equations to easily construct species accumulation curves in the field to ensure that wildlife monitoring between sites is comparable. He was also one of five chief instigators of the Australian Acoustic Observatory.

Watson, in his persona of "Dr Dave" has appeared in three series of educational videos including Dr Dave in Box-Gum Grassy Woodlands, Dr Dave in the Murray Catchment and Dr Dave in the Outback

Watson is currently a Professor of Ecology at Charles Sturt University in Albury, NSW, Australia.

Personal life 
Watson is married with three children.c

References

External links 
 
 

1973 births
Living people
Australian ornithologists
Australian ecologists